Yemen competed at the 2016 Summer Olympics in Rio de Janeiro, Brazil, from 5 to 21 August 2016. This was the nation's seventh consecutive appearance at the Summer Olympics, since its reunification in 1990.

Three Yemeni athletes, two men and one woman, were selected to the team to compete each in athletics, judo, and swimming. All of them made their Olympic debut in Rio de Janeiro, with lightweight judoka Zeyad Mater leading the Yemeni delegation as the nation's flag bearer in the opening ceremony. Yemen, however, has yet to win its first ever Olympic medal.

Athletics

Yemen has received a universality slot from IAAF to send a male athlete to the Olympics.

Track & road events

Judo
 
Yemen has received an invitation from the Tripartite Commission to send a judoka competing in the men's lightweight category (73 kg) to the Olympics.

Swimming

Yemen has received a Universality invitation from FINA to send two swimmers to the Olympics, signifying the nation's Olympic return to the sport after an eight-year hiatus.

References

External links 
 

Olympics
Nations at the 2016 Summer Olympics
2016